The Octave Chanute Aerospace Museum, the largest aviation museum in Illinois, occupied part of the grounds of the decommissioned Chanute Air Force Base in Rantoul, Illinois. It and the base were named for Octave Chanute, railroad engineer and aviation pioneer. The museum was dedicated to the life and works of Chanute, the former air base, the history of aviation in the state of Illinois, and hosted an annual air show.

Highlights of the museum included a collection of over 40 aircraft including military fighters, bombers, rescue, recon, and cargo aircraft. Many of these were used for training purposes at Chanute, and most were on loan from the United States Air Force Museum.  Other exhibits of note included a replica of the Wright 1903 Flyer, a large collection of Frasca Flight Simulators, and tributes to the veterans who have served in America's conflicts and wars.

The museum closed on November 1, 2015.

History
Chanute Air Force Base operated in Rantoul from 1917-1993. After decommission, the cleanup and conversion of the  grounds began. Economic redevelopment of the former base was a paramount concern to the surrounding community. As of 2008, portions of the site are still unoccupied, due in part to environmental concerns including asbestos contamination. Nevertheless, much has been repurposed into civilian concerns. The Octave Chanute Aerospace Museum was one of the earliest efforts, opening in 1994.

The museum was located in Grissom Hall, which functioned as the missile maintenance training facility during active Air Force operations. Until base closure in 1993, all Air Force Minuteman missile maintenance training was provided at Chanute. The building has largely been preserved and was restored to its condition at the time of base closure; four authentic Minuteman training silos were displayed at the museum.

The museum was administered under the direction of a private foundation.

Efforts to found a museum started as early as 1991, after it was recognized that the closure of the base would cause the dispersal of the aircraft on display there. A few months before it opened on 8 October 1994, the museum was involved in a dispute over the display of a B-25. The United States Air Force wanted to transfer the airplane to a base in Alabama.

On 23 April 2015, it was announced that the museum would be closing due to lack of funds on December 30 of that year. However, the closing date was later moved up and the museum closed on November 1. Some of the exhibits went to other museums in the state of Illinois. In 2016 the museum’s archival records, including blueprints, maps, publications, oral histories, photographs, scrapbooks, videotapes, and administrative records were sent to the Champaign County Historical Archives for public access and research. Some aircraft remained on-site until 2018, when they were scrapped.

Status of known artifacts once at the museum

Non-military and replica airframes
 Aeronca 65-LB Super Chief (N34496) (Fate Unknown)
 American Aerolights Eagle ultralight (Fate Unknown)
 Chanute 1896 Glider replica (Indiana Dunes Visitor Center)
 Curtiss JN-4D Jenny replica (Fate Unknown)
 Foose Tigercat (Fate Unknown)
 Mong Sport biplane (N4253J) (Fate Unknown)
 Piper PA-22-135 Tri-Pacer (N8726C) (Fate Unknown)
 Wright Flyer replica (Fate Unknown)

Frasca International in Urbana, Illinois has taken back the flight simulators it had loaned to the museum.

See also
List of aerospace museums

References

External links

 Champaign County Historical Archives, Chanute Air Force Base Archival Collection finding aids 
Rantoul National Aviation Center Airport Information
 Village of Rantoul Website
 The 99th Fighter Squadron, first unit of The Tuskegee Airmen

Aerospace museums in Illinois
Aerospace Museum
Museums in Champaign County, Illinois
Military and war museums in Illinois
Defunct museums in Illinois
Museums disestablished in 2015
2015 disestablishments in Illinois